The Perkins Hall of Administration is a historic building on the campus of Southern Methodist University in University Park, Texas. It was built in 1925, and designed in the Georgian Revival architectural style by DeWitt & Washburn. It has been listed on the National Register of Historic Places since September 27, 1980.

See also

National Register of Historic Places listings in Dallas County, Texas

References

External links

National Register of Historic Places in Dallas County, Texas
Georgian Revival architecture in Texas
School buildings completed in 1925
University and college administration buildings in the United States
Southern Methodist University
1925 establishments in Texas